The concept of Ball School Heidelberg was developed by Prof. Klaus Roth, Institute of Sports and Sports Science at Heidelberg University, Germany, in 1996. In 1998, the first Ball School courses were implemented in primary schools. All of the Ball School's programmes are scientifically reviewed, updated and fully differentiated. Ball School Heidelberg provides activity programmes for all children. It supports the children's motor development and hereby also includes kids with motor deficits as well as those who are highly talented in sports games. It was awarded in the innovation contest “Deutschland-Land der Ideen” (2009) and labelled “hallmark of excellence” by the platform for Nutrition and Movement (peb) (2003). Ball School Heidelberg is supported by the Dietmar-Hopp- as well as the Manfred-Lautenschläger Foundation.

Concept - goals, content, methods
Ball School Heidelberg is a non-profit institution with the objective of counteracting the children's ever increasing lack of movement. Children do not become specialists in one particular kind of sport, but rather all-rounders as they are trained in many sports through the holistic development of intellectual, emotional and motor skills. Playing with balls as well as the social integration within sports groups have priority – experiences children used to gain implicitly and without instruction on streets, football grounds and meadows. With its motto “from general to specific”, Ball School Heidelberg follows the basic philosophy of the integrative sports education. All sports games are seen as “family members” which resemble each other. Their similarities (modules) are singled out and taught comprehensively, i.e. non-specifically to a particular sports game. The aim is a broad fundament of basic, generalizable competences guaranteeing a fast and effective learning in all sports games. The Ball School's non-instructed teaching helps children to learn implicitly and to develop playing creativity as well as to achieve its overall goal of getting all children involved in physical activity.

During Ball School lessons, children play with their feet, hands and sticks/rackets/bats etc., acquiring skills such as recognising gaps, determining paths to the ball and the ideal position of playing it or controlling the passing of the ball. The programmes’ curricula are based on four key principles for sports programmes for children: the principles of regarding the developmental stage, of versatility (goals), of joyful learning (content) and of implicit non-instructed learning (methods).

Programmes - structure
Ball School Heidelberg is an activity programme for children from 18 months to the end of primary school. This wide span involves the task to adapt the courses’ aims, contents and methods to the different performance levels of the Ball School children. Altogether, the children go through four levels on their way of becoming young “trained” athletes pursuing health and fitness or volleyball-, tennis-, football-, hockey-, handball- or basketball-playing children.

The Ball School's levels:

The "Mini-Ball School" is a programme designed for very young children, i.e. for toddlers and pre-schoolers, in order to support the development of skills in early childhood. In addition to the training of first motor skills, emphasis is put on linguistic, cognitive and social-emotional skills. In this course, the children get the opportunity to explore and discover the environment around them independently. Furthermore, there are lessons and exercises teaching children ball games.

Apart from general sports programmes for „normal“ toddlers, pre-schoolers and primary school children, Ball School Heidelberg also offers programmes for children with attention deficit hyperactivity disorder (ADHD), for overweight/obese (“Ball School light”), for physically handicapped and highly talented children. Each programmes has its own specific concept. „Ball School INCLUSIVE“ is another Ball School programme at pilot stage which allows healthy as well as chronically ill children to play and exercise together.

Scientific monitoring
The Ball School's scientific monitoring comprises two central forms of evaluation.  Within the so-called input-evaluation, all participants (children, parents, trainers, headmasters, department heads) are asked about several aspects, including the following:
 Programme resources (Ball School: prominence, quality, effects etc.)
 Implementation resources/staff (trainers: quality, acceptance, popularity etc.)
 Implementation resources/sports facilities and material
 Participant resources (children: performance level, motivation, learning progress/success etc.)

A written interview about the Mini-Ball School, for instance, was attended by 516 educators: the nursery nurses’ feedback clarifies that the Mini-Ball School is a high-quality concept, which can be perfectly integrated into the daily routine of kindergartens (grade= A-B). Output-evaluations gather all direct results/effects of the Ball School (pre-/post testing differences), e.g.:
 The children's learning progress in the area of playing (tactics, coordination, technique)
 The frequency of accessions to sports clubs 
 The children's extracurricular engaging in sports activities

The Mini-Ball School's effects were evaluated by controlled study design. 370 children, aged 4, 5 and 6, were investigated in a longitudinal study. Children participating in the Mini-Ball School reached significant greater strides in terms of motor skills than children of the control group. In particular weak children seemed to benefit from the programme. Four-years-old children within the lower quartile reached an age-related, substandard motor quotient of 87.7 (standard quotient MQ= 100). When participating in a Ball School programme they could improve and reach an outstanding quotient (MQ = 106) when they were 6 and 12 years old.

Further output-evaluations were conducted including those evaluating the development of playing intelligence and -creativity of Ball School children at primary school age as well as those evaluating the programmes for children with ADHD, for overweight/obese and physically handicapped children.

Cooperation
Ball School Heidelberg is cooperating with kindergartens, schools, sports clubs, sports associations, national and international centres as well as commercial sports providers. In Germany, there is a dense network of cooperating day care centres, primary schools and more than 300 partnerships with sports clubs and –associations. The latter include smaller multi- or single-branch- as well as well-known clubs, such as TSG Hoffenheim, Rhein-Neckar-Löwen, Adler Mannheim, Eintracht Frankfurt, Werder Bremen, SC Freiburg, THW Kiel, VfL Gummersbach and Brose Baskets Bamberg. The Ball School's national expansion is supported by centres in Munich, Bamberg, Cologne, Halle, Hamburg and Kiel. These are managed by Ball School experts and are also allowed to arrange cooperation agreements in their (stipulated) region and to train Ball School staff.

The ABC-curricula has been translated into Portuguese, Spanish, Hungarian, Russian, Chinese, Japanese and English (USA) and serves as a basis for the work of international Ball School centres.

Training
One central aspect in the Ball School's dissemination is its system of basic and advanced training. Basic training refers to the Ball School's ABC (primary school children) and the Mini Ball School. Advanced training includes specific add-on programmes (advanced training in throwing games, in adiposity etc.). A participation in one of the Ball School's basic training requires a C-level trainer certification issued by a sports association as well as a minimum age of 16. A trainer certification may be compensated by an evidence of comparable knowledge and skills, such as qualifications which do not necessarily need to be finished by the time of application (sports- and gymnastic teacher etc., study of sports), or by work experience (nursery nurses, primary school teachers, longstanding training activity etc.).

History and institutional integration
In cooperation with FT Kirchheim, Ball School Heidelberg was first offered in Heidelberg's primary schools in 1998. In 2002, the friend's association “Ballschule e. V” was founded. Between 2005 and 2014, the Ball School's activities concerning cooperation and training highly increased. On 1 January 2015, the association's structure was turned into a limited company (Ltd.). The new, non-profit organisation is called “Vision BewegungsKinder” and, like Ball School Heidelberg, is planning to design further innovative programmes for supporting children's motor skills.

Today, more than 150 Ball School centres exit in Germany and the concept is also expanding internationally. Ball School Heidelberg has been introduced in Brazil, Mexico, Japan, Slovenia, Austria, South Africa and USA through various projects and has established a global presence.

During the school year 2010/11 more than 1,000 children were enrolled in one of the 90 classes offered at 60 cooperating primary schools in the metropolitan area of Heidelberg. As the Ball School is flourishing, the numbers are increasing steadily.

Publications (selection) 
 E. J. Hossner, K. Roth (2002). Sportspiele vermitteln. In K. Ferger, N., Gissel, J. Schwier (Hrsg.): Sportspiele erleben, vermitteln, trainieren (S. 111–124). Hamburg: Czwalina.
 K. Roth (1999): Das ABC des Spielens: Technik- und Taktiktraining im Anfängerbereich. In J. Wiemeyer (Hrsg.): Techniktraining im Sport (S. 11–30). Darmstadt: IfS.
 K. Roth (2000): Die Heidelberger Ballschule: Praxiskonsequenzen des Modells der inzidentellen Inkubation. In W. Schmidt, A. Knollenberg (Hrsg.): Sport – Spiel – Forschung: Gestern. Heute. Morgen (S. 175–179). Hamburg: Czwalina.
 K. Roth (2003). Ballschule Rückschlagspiele: Theoretische Grundlagen. In A. Woll (Hrsg.): Miteinander lernen, forschen, spielen – Zukunftsperspektiven für Tennis (S. 41–58). Hamburg: Czwalina.
 K. Roth (2006). Ballschule Heidelberg: Vom Talentförderprojekt zum erfolgreichen „Kindersportangebot für Alle“. In F. Bockrath (Hrsg.): Trends in der Sportvermittlung (S. 13–40). Darmstadt: TU.
 K. Roth (2014): Motorik ABC. In I. Hunger, R. Zimmer (Hrsg.): Inklusion bewegt: Herausforderungen für die frühkindliche Bildung (S. 147–163). Schorndorf: Hofmann.
 K. Roth, T. Damm, M. Pieper, C. Roth (2014). Ballschule in der Primarstufe. Sportstunde Grundschule Band 1. Schorndorf: Hofmann.
 K. Roth, C. Kröger (2011). Ballschule – ein ABC für Spielanfänger (4. Aufl.) Schorndorf: Hofmann.
 K. Roth, C. Kröger, D. Memmert (2002). Ballschule Rückschlagspiele. Schorndorf: Hofmann.
 K. Roth, D. Memmert, R. Schubert (2006). Ballschule Wurfspiele. Schorndorf: Hofmann.
 K. Roth, M. Raab (1999). Taktische Regelbildungen: „Mühsam, konzentriert, intentional oder mühelos, nebensächlich, inzidentell?“ In M. Wegner, A. Wilhelm, J.-P. Janssen (Hrsg.): Empirische Forschung im Sportspiel – Methodologie, Fakten und Reflexionen (S. 73–84). Kiel: IfSS.
 K. Roth, C. Roth, U. Hegar (2014). Mini-Ballschule: Das ABC des Spielens für Klein- und Vorschulkinder. Schorndorf: Hofmann.

References

External links

 Vision Bewegungskinder gGmbH

Heidelberg University